Federico Colli (Brescia- Italy, 10 August 1988) is an Italian classical pianist.
“His beautifully light touch and lyrical grace make the music shine.” (The Daily Telegraph).
He won the First Prize at the Salzburg Mozart Competition in 2011 and the First Prize with Gold Medal at The Leeds International Piano Competition in 2012.
After these achievements, he embarked on a series of concerts in different parts of the world, playing with renowned Orchestras, esteemed Conductors, at famous Theaters and for prestigious Festivals, always obtaining a great success from the audiences and critics.
He has been rapidly gaining worldwide recognition for his compelling, unconventional interpretations and clarity of sound. The remarkable originality and highly imaginative, philosophical approach to music-making have distinguished his performances and recordings as miraculous and multidimensional: "There’s no doubt that Federico Colli is one of the more original thinkers of his generation." (Gramophone).
The second volume entirely dedicated to Scarlatti's Sonatas (CHANDOS 20134) was chosen by Classical Music-BBC Music Magazine as one of the best classical album released in 2020: "This is a superb release from the most scintillating and personal of all young artists." (International Piano).
He has been studying at the Milan Conservatory, Imola International Piano Academy and Salzburg Mozarteum, under the guidance of Sergio Marengoni, Konstantin Bogino, Boris Petrushansky and Pavel Gililov.
He received from the Municipality of Brescia the "Grosso d'Argento" as a prize for the international prestige given to his hometown and the Music Section of the UK Critics’ Circle included him among the recipients of its 2018 Awards.

References

1988 births
Italian male pianists
Musicians from Brescia
Living people
21st-century pianists
21st-century Italian male musicians